The Polish Border Guard (also abbreviated as SG) is a state security agency tasked with patrolling the Polish border. It existed in the Second Republic era from 1928 to 1939 and was reestablished in the modern-day Third Republic in 1990, going into operation the following year. During the communist era lasting from 1945 to 1989, the role of the border guard was carried out by the Border Protection Troops.

History

1928–1939 
The Straż Graniczna was founded in 1928. During the times of the Second Polish Republic, it was responsible for northern, western and southern border of Poland (with Germany, Free City of Danzig, sea border, Czechoslovakia and Romania). Eastern border, often raided by military bands supported by Soviet Union was under the jurisdiction of a separate, military formation (Border Protection Corps).

Responsibilities of Straż Graniczna included:
 prevention of illegal crossing of the land and sea border by people and goods (smuggling)
 ensuring safety and public order in the border area
 combat any threats to national security in the border area

Border Guard was organized in a military style, with uniformed and armed agents. It was controlled by the Ministry of Treasury, Ministry of Internal Affairs, and Ministry of Military Affairs. The highest level of organizational structure of the agency was Main Headquarters, based in Warsaw. It was followed by Regional Inspectorates, Border Inspectorates, stations and posts. It carried out actions through patrols, manning border checkpoints, tracking, rouses and intelligence work. It had its own river and sea flotilla, intelligence academy, and the Main School of Border Guard, which was located firstly in Góra Kalwaria (until 1928), then in Rawa Ruska. The school had a department of training of guard dogs, also located in Rawa Ruska.

Each station of the agency was responsible for some 20 to 25 kilometers of the borderline. The stations oversaw posts of the first line and posts of the second line. In 1938, there were 129 stations of the Border Guard, 419 posts of the first line (these were located right along the border), and 212 posts of the second line (located in the interior of the country, right behind posts of the first line).

Regional inspectorates in 1939
 Mazovian Regional Inspectorate in Ciechanów,
 Pomeranian Regional Inspectorate in Bydgoszcz,
 Greater Poland Regional Inspectorate in Poznań,
 Silesian Regional Inspectorate in Katowice,
 Western Lesser Poland Regional Inspectorate in Kraków,
 Eastern Lesser Poland Regional Inspectorate in Lwów.
 Agency of the Customs Inspectorate of the Free City of Gdańsk.

In late 1938 and early 1939, following changes of borders of some Eastern European countries, the Border Guard took over protection of the boundary with Lithuania, while Border Defence Corps moved some of its units to the newly established border with Hungary. Furthermore, every station of the Border Guard was strengthened with a platoon of the Polish Land Forces.

Members of Straż Graniczna, under General Walerian Czuma, participated in the Second World War, fighting during the invasion of Poland together with Land Forces units.

1945–1989 
During the period of the Polish People's Republic, the role of the border guards was carried out by the military formation of Border Protection Troops, being a part of the Polish People's Army and reporting directly to the Ministry of Interior, formerly under the Ministry of National Defense (from 1945 to 1949 and again from 1965 to 1970 and 1972), just as its 2nd Republic predecessors were assigned. After the martial law, border battalions were reconstructed. Battalions were re-established in Sanok, Nowy Targ, Cieszyn, Racibórz, Prudnik, Zgorzelec, Gubin, Słubice and Chojna. The organization of battalions in Nowy Sącz, Lubań Śląski and Szczecin was stopped at the stage of the backbone commands. These were later disbanded.

1990 – present
Straż Graniczna has been reestablished in the Third Polish Republic as a civil, police-type service, with the act of 12 October 1990 and began operations on 16 May 1991. It considers itself the successor to the Second Polish Republic formations of the Straż Graniczna and Korpus Ochrony Pogranicza (plus the military heritage of the Wojska Ochrony Pogranicza of the People's Republic), and thus is one of the only police styled forces to use military style ranks (the Government Protection Bureau, Agencja Bezpieczeństwa Wewnętrznego and the Służba Więzienna also use them as well).

From 1 May 2004, the day Poland became a member of the European Union, Straż Graniczna performs its responsibility to guard and protect both the Polish and EU borders.

Structure
Border Guard General Headquarters (Warsaw) 
Warmińsko-Mazurski Border Guard Regional Unit (Kętrzyn)
Podlaski Border Guard Regional Unit (Białystok)
Bug Border Guard Regional Unit (Chełm)
Bieszczady Border Guard Regional Unit (Przemyśl)
Śląski Border Guard Regional Unit (Racibórz)
Odra Border Guard Regional Unit (Krosno Odrzańskie)
Sea Border Guard Regional Unit (Gdańsk)
Vistula Border Guard Regional Unit (Warsaw)
Carpathian Border Guard Regional Unit (Nowy Sącz).

Equipment

New Border Wall
 New border wall under construction on Poland-Belarus border: 6 m high, 115 km long.

Firearms 
 Mossberg 500 
 FB MSBS Grot 5.56×45mm
 Heckler & Koch MP5 9×19mm Parabellum
 Glock 9×19mm Parabellum
 Glock 9×19mm Parabellum
 CZ P-10 C 9×19mm Parabellum

Aircraft

 PZL-104 Wilga 
PZL M-28 
PZL M-20 Mewa 
Stemme ASP S15 
Let L-410 Turbolet

Helicopters

PZL W-3 Sokół 
Eurocopter EC135 
PZL Kania 
Robinson R44

Vessels

Griffon Hoverwork 2000TD
Type SAR-1500
SPORTIS S-7500
Sportis S-7500K
Type Mi-6
Type SKS-40
Type TM-623 OB CABIN
Type TM-923 OB
Type TM-1025 2IB CABIN
Type IC 16 M III
Type PARKER 1000 BALTIC
Type Patrol 240 (Patrol 24 Baltic)
Type SG-071

Notable Border Guard commanders
 Walerian Czuma

Ranks
Officers

Enlisted

Gallery

See also
Border Protection Corps
Border Protection Troops
Tax and Customs Service (Poland)

References

External links

 Straż Graniczna Homepage in Polish

Borders of Poland
Military units and formations of Poland
Polish Border Guard